David E. Rued (born May 17, 1932) was an American politician, farmer, and educator.

Rued lived in Aitkin, Aitkin County, Minnesota with his wife and family. He went to Big Lake High School in Big Lake, Minnesota and to St. Cloud State University. Rued served in the United States Air Force during the Korean War. He graduated from University of Minnesota in 1959 and went to graduate school concerning agricultural education at University of Minnesota. He was a farmer and an agricultural vocational teacher. Reu= served on the Aitken, Minnesota School Board and was involved with the Aitkin County Agricultural Society. Rued served in the Minnesota Senate from 1978 to 1982 and was a Republican.

References

1932 births
Living people
People from Aitkin, Minnesota
Military personnel from Minnesota
Educators from Minnesota
Farmers from Minnesota
St. Cloud State University alumni
University of Minnesota alumni
School board members in Minnesota
Republican Party Minnesota state senators